Durak Zenan-e Olya (also Romanized as Dūrak Zenān-e ‘Olyā) is a village in Holayjan Rural District, in the Central District of Izeh County, Khuzestan Province, Iran. At the 2006 census, its population was 273, in 46 families.

References 

Populated places in Izeh County